"Moving On" is a song performed by American electronic music producer Marshmello on May 5, 2017 via Joytime Collective.

Background 
Marshmello shared a teaser for the music video of "Moving On" on social media on May 3, 2017, ahead of the song's premiere. The video shows fictionalized versions of Marshmello, Slushii, Skrillex, & Ookay graduating from high school.

Track listing

Charts

Weekly charts

Year-end charts

Release history

References 

2017 songs
2017 singles
Marshmello songs
Future bass songs